Quicksilver is a song, which became a hit for Bing Crosby in 1950. It was written by Eddie Pola, George Wyle and Irving Taylor.

A composition of the same name by jazz pianist Horace Silver was first recorded in 1952 and has become most associated with him.

Bing Crosby
"Quicksilver" was recorded by Bing Crosby and the Andrews Sisters with Vic Schoen and his orchestra on November 25, 1949  and it became a top 10 hit in February 1950.  In late February 1950 it was cited by Billboard as the fifth most popular record on jukeboxes. It peaked in mid March at Number 8 in the singles charts. By the end of April it was still in the charts at Number 30. It was the best selling single in Australia for the year of 1950.

Another version of this song was recorded by Doris Day & Her Country Cousins in 1949 and this also reached the USA charts with a peak position of No. 20.

Horace Silver and others
Another song of the same title was later recorded by Horace Silver in 1952, based on his interpretation of "Lover Come Back to Me".  "Quicksilver" was performed and recorded live in 1954 at New York City's Birdland by Art Blakey and his Quintet which included Silver, Clifford Brown, Lou Donaldson, and Curly Russell. It appears on the Blue Note Records album by them, A Night at Birdland Vol. 1.

Cannonball Adderley recorded a "near-frantic" version of it which he called "Spectacular". Lee Morgan recorded it with Howard Rumsey's Lighthouse All-Stars group. The song has more recently been performed in tributes to Horace Silver, such as the Arale Kaminsky Quintet in 2014.

References

1950 songs
1950 singles
Bing Crosby songs
1950s jazz standards
Songs with lyrics by Edward Pola
Songs with music by George Wyle
Songs written by Irving Taylor (songwriter)